Hunan University station is a subway station in Changsha, Hunan, China, operated by the Changsha subway operator Changsha Metro. Its name is derived from the nearby Hunan University campus.

Station layout
The station has one island platform.

History
The station was completed in November 2017 and opened on 26 May 2019.

Surrounding area
 Hunan University

References

Railway stations in Hunan
Railway stations in China opened in 2019
Railway stations in China at university and college campuses